Krumdiack Homestead (also known as the Cook Property) is located on the northern coast of Waldron Island, Washington between Fishery Point and Point Hammond.

It was built in 1890 by Friedrich Krumdiak.  The site was added to the National Register of Historic Places in 1993.

References

Historic districts on the National Register of Historic Places in Washington (state)
Houses on the National Register of Historic Places in Washington (state)
1890s architecture in the United States
Houses in San Juan County, Washington
National Register of Historic Places in San Juan County, Washington